Halal tourism (sometimes called Halal travel or halal-friendly tourism) is a subcategory of tourism which is geared towards Muslim families who abide by rules of Islam. The hotels in such destinations do not serve alcohol, have separate swimming pools and spa facilities for men and women, serve only halal foods, and have prayer facilities in-room and in a common hall. Travel agents, while designing travel packages for this, follow guidelines of halal. Malaysia, Turkey and many more countries offer facilities in accordance with the religious beliefs of Muslim tourists in order to attract more customers. Currently, there exist no internationally recognized standards on Halal tourism.

The Halal tourism industry also provides flights where no alcohol or pork products are served, prayer timings are announced, and religious programs are broadcast as part of entertainment offered on board.

Many international hotels do serve halal food that is slaughtered in accordance with the teachings of Islamic Sharia and is free of any substances forbidden by Islam such as pork and alcohol. Some hotels have employed people from the Muslim world to provide translation services and other assistance that may be needed by tourists from Muslim countries.

The Economist's article on Halal Business published on May 25, 2013: "It is not just manufactured halal products. Services such as halal holidays are booming, too. Crescent Tours, a London-based online travel specialist, books clients into hotels in Turkey that have separate swimming pools for men and women, no-alcohol policies and halal restaurants, and rents out private holiday villas with high walls", which was featured on Forbes offers Muslim-friendly hotels and advice about halal food options, Quran availability and more.

Based on a report by Thomson Reuters, in 2014 Muslims from around the globe spent $142 billion on travel (excluding Hajj and Umrah). In comparison, travellers from China spent $160 billion on travel in 2014, while US travellers spent $143 billion, placing the Muslim travel sector in third place in global travel spending and accounting for 11 per cent of total global expenditures on travel.

Muslim travel contributed over US$156 billion to global GDP in 2016 and is primed to grow to US$220 billion by 2020, according to the Global Muslim Travel Index 2017 by CrescentRating.

Muslim travel standard

In 2008, CrescentRating was launched as the world's first online hotel reference tool dedicated to Muslim travellers. CrescentRating is divided into a rating scale of 1 through 7 and categories based on the range of amenities and services each participating property offers Muslim guests, including availability of prayer carpets, qibla direction, alcohol policies and availability of halal-certified food.

In 2015, a similar halal classification system called Salam Standard was launched by Tripfez. It has a 4-level classification system ranging from bronze to platinum. The classification system has been recognized and supported by the Ministry of Tourism, Arts and Culture (Malaysia) and the Islamic Tourism Center  and presented at the COMCEC conference under the auspices of the Organisation of Islamic Cooperation (OIC) in 2017.

UK Halal tourism
In April 2017, UK ranked 20th in the overall Global Muslim Travel Index but 3rd in the Non-OIC destinations beating Spain despite its past Islamic heritage. Part of the success was due to it Air Connectivity, ease of communication, family friendly destination and ease of prayers spaces which may stem from its domestic population of Muslims.

A key player in Halal tourism within UK is Muslim History Tours, who have given speeches about Halal tourism in UK to the National Tourist Office Visit Britain and local authorities and offers consultation to shopping destinations to make services user-friendly to Arab and Muslim tourist. In 2015, they were World's Runners Up in the Best Halal Tour Operator narrowly missing out to Etihad Hala. Their niche market provides Halal friendly hotels, professionally qualified guided tours, Halal meals on River Thames Cruises, a Muslim History sightseeing tour bus of London was launched in April 2017 and the most recent introduction appears to have been black taxi tours. They were selected in Sept 2017 to be 1 of 7 of the best halal holidays by The National, UAE. They were featured in The Londonist with its founder AbdulMaalik Tailor discovering London's first Mosque in 1895. There was further coverage on London Live and The Muslim Vibe. For Eid 2018, they were commissioned by one of the world's most famous art galleries, Tate Britain to deliver the first Islamic tour, which broke a record for the most attendees on a tour at Tate Britain The tour raised wider concerns with regards to labels and how commentary is interpreted with Tailor calling for the need to revisit some of the established narratives of classic works of art.

References

External links
The Guardian - The birth of halal holidays
 CNN Travel - Halal Tourism's Moment In The Sun
 BBC - Halal Holidays In The Sun
 The Economist - Consuming passions

Halal food
Religious tourism
Hajj